Oubre is a surname. Notable people with the surname include:

 Alondra Oubré, American medical anthropologist
 George T. Oubre (1918–1998), American politician
 Kelly Oubre Jr. (born 1995), American basketball player
 Louis Oubre (born 1958), American football player